Strike It Rich is a 1933 British comedy film directed by Leslie S. Hiscott and starring Betty Astell, Davy Burnaby, George K. Gee and Wilfrid Lawson. It was made as a quota quickie at Beaconsfield Studios.

Cast
 George K. Gee as Eddie Smart  
 Gina Malo as Mary  
 Davy Burnaby as Humphrey Wells  
 Betty Astell as Janet Wells  
 Ernest Sefton as Sankey 
 Cyril Raymond as Slaughter  
 Wilfrid Lawson as Raikes
 Hal Walters 
 Ethel Warwick

References

Bibliography
 Low, Rachael. Filmmaking in 1930s Britain. George Allen & Unwin, 1985.
 Wood, Linda. British Films, 1927-1939. British Film Institute, 1986.

External links
 

1933 films
1933 comedy films
1930s English-language films
Films directed by Leslie S. Hiscott
British comedy films
Films shot at Beaconsfield Studios
Quota quickies
British black-and-white films
1930s British films